was a town located in Nishiuwa District, Ehime Prefecture, Japan.

As of 2003, the town had an estimated population of 8,660 and a density of 209.38 persons per km2. The total area was 41.36 km2.

On April 1, 2004, Mikame, along with the towns of Akehama, Nomura, Shirokawa and Uwa (all from Higashiuwa District), was merged to create the city of Seiyo.

External links
Official website of Seiyo in Japanese

Dissolved municipalities of Ehime Prefecture
Seiyo, Ehime